Qırıqlı (also, Qırıxlı, Kyrykhly, and Kyrykly) is a village and municipality in the Goranboy Rayon of Azerbaijan.  It has a population of 932. The municipality consists of the villages of Qırıqlı, Qarapirimli, and Gülməmmədli.

References 

Populated places in Goranboy District